{{DISPLAYTITLE:C6H11N3}}
The molecular formula C6H11N3 (molar mass: 125.17 g/mol, exact mass: 125.0953 u) may refer to:

 α-Methylhistamine
 4-Methylhistamine

Molecular formulas